The International C series and its succeeding models is a series of pickup trucks that were built by International Harvester from 1961 to 1968. They succeeded the earlier B-series range.

History
  In 1961, the C-series trucks appeared as well as the four-door (crew-cab) Travelette. At first this would seem to have been another facelift, featuring a modernized front end, but it also meant a whole new chassis with all new independent front torsion bar suspension. The new chassis and suspension allowed for the cab to be mounted four inches lower, meaning an even bigger transmission tunnel hump but also a more car-like ride. The standard pickup bed was joined by a straight-sided “Bonus-Load” bed. There was also a utility “workshop” version.

The most obvious visual differences were that the twin headlights were now mounted side-by-side, and a new grille of a concave egg-crate design. This front end was produced from 1961 to 1962 before going to one headlight on each side of a re-designed grill starting in 1963. The wheelbase was longer, as the front wheels were mounted further forward. This increased the front clearance angle in spite of the lower body. The 1961 International Harvester C-series Travelette was the first American-made four-door, four-wheel-drive production pickup truck.

The Travelall range underwent the same changes as did the light trucks, in April 1961. The C-100/C-110 Travelall now rode on a 119 inch chassis. Similar to the Travelall was a four-door panel van, with glazing for the front doors only.

The pickups continued to undergo a continuous stream of minor modifications to the grilles and headlight fitment. For model years 1963 and 1964, the renamed range (C-900 to C-1500) received single headlights. For 1965 the name became the D series, followed by the 900A-1500A in 1966, 900B-1500B for the next year, and the last year (1968) which was unsurprisingly called 900C-1500C, depending on weight rating. New for 1968 was the option of AMC’s 232 cubic inch inline-six engine, rather than International’s own BG-series six. The Travelall was considered a version of the light-duty pickup range, rather than a separate model, until major changes to the bodywork took place in 1969 for the 1970 model year. While completely different in appearance, now looking very similar to the Scout, the resulting D series continued this naming convention until the 1971 Light Line pickups were introduced.

See also
International Harvester#Light duty trucks
List of International Harvester vehicles

References

Further reading

External links

 

C series
Vehicles introduced in 1961
1960s cars
Pickup trucks